Abdur-Rahman Mubarakpuri (born; 1865 – 22 January 1935) was an Islamic scholar specializing in hadiths.

Early life and education
Mubarakpuri memorize Qur'an and studied Urdu and Farsi literature in childhood. Then from his father and other scholars he studied books on literature, essays and ethics in Farsi. He also studied for five years from Abdullah Ghazipur, president of Madrasa Chashme-e-Rahmat. And then studied hadith from Syed Nazeer Husain in Delhi. Stuideid Kutub al-Sittah and other hadith books from Husayn ibn Muhsin Al-Yamani Al-Ansari.

Literary works
Sheikh Mubarakpuri has written books, including on the defense of the Sunnah of the Prophet. His books include:

 Tuhfat Al-Ahwadhi
 Abkār al-minan fī tanqīd Āthār al-sunan
 Al-Lubāb fī takhrīj al-Mubārakfūrī li-qawl al-Tirmidhī wa-fī al-bāb
 Fawāʼid fī ʻulūm al-Ḥadīth wa-kutubihi wa-ahlih	
 Muqaddimat Tuḥfat al-aḥwadī

Death
He died on 22 January 1935.

References

1865 births
1935 deaths
People from Azamgarh district
Writers from Uttar Pradesh
Indian Arabic writers
19th-century Indian writers
20th-century Indian writers
19th-century Indian male writers
20th-century Indian male writers
19th-century Indian Muslims
20th-century Indian Muslims
Indian Islamic religious leaders
Hadith scholars
Ahl-i Hadith people